The Six Nations Under 20s Championship is an international rugby union tournament. It is the under-20s equivalent of the Six Nations Championship. Originally the tournament was in an under-21 format but changed to under-20s in 2008. England were the inaugural winners and they have gone on to be the tournament's most successful team, winning nine titles. The tournament is played annually during February and March on the same weekends as the senior men's Six Nations.

Winners

Statistics

References

 
European youth sports competitions
Under-20 rugby union competitions
2008 establishments in Europe
Recurring sporting events established in 2008